"Reminisce" is a song by American singer Mary J. Blige from her debut album, What's the 411? (1992). It was co-written by Kenny Greene and Dave "Jam" Hall, who also produced it. Described as a new jack swing song inspired by 1970s soul music, it contains a sample of "Stop, Look, Listen" (1989) by American rapper MC Lyte. The single peaked at number fifty-seven on the Billboard Hot 100 and number six on the Hot R&B/Hip-Hop Songs chart. A more uptempo and hip hop-inspired remix of the song, featuring duo Pete Rock & CL Smooth, later appeared on Blige's 1993 remix album of the same name.

Critical reception
In an retrospective review, Daryl McIntosh from Albumism said that the song followed what seemed to be Combs' formula for the Yonkers, "by revolving around another '80s hip-hop sample, this time from Audio Two's close associate and femcee rhyme titan MC Lyte's "Stop, Look, and Listen". The Daily Vault's Mark Millan described it as "a slick, Whitney-esque R&B track that gives Blige a chance to prove she can sing just as well as rap." In his weekly UK chart commentary, James Masterton commented, "All of a sudden soul is making a comeback, helped in part perhaps by a new show on Radio 1 on Wednesday nights devoted to the music. "Reminisce" thus becomes another in a long line of New Jack Swing tracks to chart in this region although none have gone on to major success." Andy Beevers from Music Week gave the song four out of five. The RM Dance Update complimented it as "superb". An editor from The Observer remarked that it hinted at "the loss and melancholy behind much of hip hop's aggression". Jonathan Bernstein from Spin praised its "irresistible bounce".

Music video
A music video was produced to promote the single, directed by American film and music video director Marcus Raboy. It opens with Mary J. Blige struggling to sleep in a bed during a storm. She later performs in the doorway of a large room with gray walls. Throughout the video, a man sometimes appears. "Reminisce" was later published by Vevo on YouTube in June 2009, and had generated more than 7.3 million views as of January 2023.

Tracklisting

U.S. Cassette singleU.S. 7" single
 "Reminisce" (Radio version) – 4:30
 "Reminisce" (Instrumental) – 5:17

U.S. Cassette Maxi-singleU.S. CD Maxi-singleU.S. 12" single
 "Reminisce" (Bad Boy Remix) – 5:14
 "Reminisce" (Bad Boy Instrumental) – 5:15
 "Reminisce" (Audio 2 Remix) – 5:24
 "Reminisce" (Milky Mix) – 5:24
 "Reminisce" (Stringapella) – 5:22

European CD single
 "Reminisce" (Bad Boy Remix) – 5:14
 "Reminisce" (Pressure Point 12") – 4:30
 "Reminisce" (Milky Mix) – 5:24
 "Leave a Message" (Album version) – 3:37

U.K. Cassette single
 "Reminisce" (Driza Radio) – 3:37
 "Reminisce" (Album Edit) – 4:13

U.K. CD single
 "Reminisce" (Driza Radio) – 3:37
 "Reminisce" (Album Edit) – 4:13
 "Reminisce" (Bad Boy Remix) – 5:14
 "Reminisce" (Drizabone 12") – 5:34
 "Reminisce" (Audio 2 Remix) – 5:24

U.K. 12" single
 "Reminisce" (Drizabone 12") – 5:34
 "Reminisce" (Drizabone instrumental) – 5:17
 "Reminisce" (Bad Boy Remix) – 5:14
 "Reminisce" (Album Edit) – 4:13

U.K. 12" single (Remix)
 "Reminisce" (Pressure Point 12")
 "Reminisce" (Pressure Point Dub)
 "Reminisce" (Audio 2 Remix)
 "Reminisce" (Milky Mix)

Credits and personnel
Credits adapted from the What's the 411? liner notes.

 Sean "Puffy" Combs – executive producer, co-producer
 Charlie Davis – executive producer
 Dave "Jam" Hall – producer
 Kurt Woodley – executive producer

Charts

Weekly charts

Year-end charts

References

Notes
 

1992 singles
Mary J. Blige songs
Music videos directed by Marcus Raboy
Songs written by Dave Hall (record producer)
Songs written by Kenny Greene
1992 songs
Song recordings produced by Dave Hall (record producer)
MCA Records singles